This is a list of bibliometrics software.

References